Betsy Beutler is an American actress. She is known for her role as Katie Collins on the NBC/ABC series Scrubs (2009), the related webisode series Scrubs: Interns (2009), and her roles in The Black Donnellys (2007), Legit (2014), You're the Worst (2015), Law & Order: Special Victims Unit (2017), Blindspot (2017) and Inside Game (2018).

Life and career
Betsy was born in Oklahoma. A series regular on The Black Donnellys, which filmed in New York City, Betsy moved to Los Angeles after the cancellation of the show and was cast in Scrubs.

Filmography

Television

Video games

References

External links
 
 

21st-century American actresses
American film actresses
Year of birth missing (living people)
Living people
Actresses from Oklahoma
American television actresses